Rajmata Vijaya Raje Scindia Airport , also known as Gwalior Airport, is a domestic airport and an Indian Air Force base serving the city of Gwalior, Madhya Pradesh, India. It is located in Maharajpur, 10 km (6 mi) north-east of the city premises. It is one of the six airports in Madhya Pradesh. The civil enclave is built on 29 acres of area. IndiGo and SpiceJet airlines operate scheduled flight services to and from the airport. It is named after Vijaya Raje Scindia, the former Maharani of Gwalior and a prominent Member of Parliament.

Structure
The  apron can handle two Airbus A320 and one small aircraft simultaneously. The Gwalior Air Base is the only operational air force base with two operational parallel runways. The second runway was built in February 2009 and became operational in October 2010.

Airlines and destinations

Statistics

Expansion

The airport will get a new terminal building, ancillary buildings and a car parking area for ₹ 446 crore, under the airport's expansion project. The Airports Authority of India (AAI) has taken up the work for expansion of the airport. It includes the construction of the new terminal building of an area of 20,000 sq.m. to handle 1,400 peak hour passengers, ancillary buildings, car parking, city side development and other associated works at the airport. There will be some modern technologies, such as rainwater harvesting and solar energy will be used in the development of the new terminal building, by the commissioning of a new 2.5 GW solar power plant.

The project is expected to be completed by July 2023. The construction of the new apron and the taxiways including associated works for parking of 13 aircraft at the airport will be built at an estimated cost of ₹ 38.51 crore, to be completed by June 2023.

Accidents and incidents
On May 6, 2021, a Beechcraft 250 belonging to the state of Madhya Pradesh crashed while landing at the airport. The three crew were hospitalized with minor injuries. The aircraft was carrying Remdesivir injections, which were undamaged.

References

External links

Airports in Madhya Pradesh
Transport in Gwalior
World War II sites in India
Year of establishment missing